Tetragnatha extensa is a species of spider found across the Northern Hemisphere. It lives on low vegetation in damp areas, and feeds on flying insects which it catches in its web.

Description
T. extensa has an elongated, cream-coloured body. The four pairs of legs are very long, and are dark yellow. The carapace, which is around 1.8–2.6 mm long and 1.1–1.7 mm wide, is orange or dark yellow.

The colouring of T. extensa is quite variable, ranging from creamy-yellow to green. On the underside, there is a thick black central band, with a silvery band on either side.

T. extensa is distinguished from other members of the genus Tetragnatha by the minute curved tip of the male's conductor (part of the pedipalp), and the form of the female's spermatheca.

Distribution 
T. extensa has a wide distribution across the Northern Hemisphere (Holarctic).

In North America, it is found from Alaska to Newfoundland, and its range extends south to Washington, Colorado and Pennsylvania. The species has a broad ecological range, having been found at the tree line in the Rocky Mountains.

It is found in coastal vegetation in Europe. T. extensa is found throughout the United Kingdom, where it is the commonest species of Tetragnatha, and one of the commonest spiders. It is also found in Madeira.

Ecology and behaviour
Tetragnatha extensa is found on low-growing vegetation, usually in damp areas. It feeds on insects, including mosquitos, midges and moths, which it catches in its loosely constructed web. When alarmed, it will sit along a plant stem, a blade of grass or the central vein of a leaf, with its four front legs pointing forwards, and its four back legs pointing backwards for camouflage. T. extensa is able to walk on the surface of water, where it can move faster than on land.

Life cycle
Adults are seen between May and September in the United Kingdom, and between May and July in Alaska. There is little courtship, and the male and female lock jaws, possibly to prevent the female from eating the male before mating. The egg sacs are globular and covered with grey tufted silk, resembling a bird dropping, and are pressed against a plant stem. Overwintering occurs in the form of early-instar spiderlings.

Taxonomic history
Tetragnatha extensa was first given a binomial by Carl Linnaeus in his Systema Naturae of 1758, the starting point of zoological nomenclature. In that work, it was included in the genus Aranea (now Araneus). T. extensa is a very common, widespread and variable species, and a number of synonyms have been published:

Aranea extensa Linnaeus, 1758
Aranea solandri Scopoli, 1763
Aranea mouffeti Scopoli, 1763
Tetragnatha rubra Risso, 1826
Tetragnatha gibba C. L. Koch, 1837
Tetragnatha chrysochlora Walckenaer, 1841
Tetragnatha arundinis Bremi-Wolff, 1849
Tetragnatha fluviatilis Keyserling, 1865
Tetragnatha nowickii L. Koch, 1870
Tetragnatha groenlandica Thorell, 1872
Tetragnatha solandri (Scopoli, 1763)
Tetragnatha manitoba Chamberlin & Ivie, 1942
Tetragnatha rusticana Chickering, 1959
Tetragnatha potanini Schenkel, 1963
Tetragnatha maderiana Wunderlich, 1987

References

External links

Tetragnathidae
Holarctic spiders
Spiders of Europe
Arthropods of Madeira
Spiders of Russia
Spiders of Asia
Fauna of Iran
Spiders of North America
Fauna of Alaska
Spiders described in 1758
Taxa named by Carl Linnaeus